"Prisoner of Love" was the second single released by the American band Miami Sound Machine on their first English language album, and eighth overall, Eyes of Innocence. The song was written by the band's drummer and lead songwriter Enrique "Kiki" Garcia.

Song history
The single was released worldwide following the release of the album with great expectations. The lead single, "Dr. Beat", also written by Enrique Garcia, had moderate success, and performed especially well on the dance charts. "Prisoner of Love" was unable to follow the success, debuting on the UK Singles Chart at only #98 and failing to chart elsewhere. The single was only released in Europe. In the United States, "I Need a Man" was released as the second single.

Track listing
 7" single
"Prisoner Of Love" (Enrique E. Garcia) – 3:55
"I Need Your Love" (Enrique E. Garcia) – 4:33

 12" single
"Prisoner Of Love (Remix)" (Enrique E. Garcia) – 6:36 (remixed by Pablo Flores)
"Prisoner Of Love (Instrumental)" (Enrique E. Garcia) – 4:45
"Toda Tuya (Todo Dia Eva Dia De Indio)" (Gloria M. Estefan, Jorge Ben) – 4:39

Charts

References

1984 singles
Miami Sound Machine songs
Gloria Estefan songs
Songs written by Enrique Garcia (songwriter)
1984 songs
Epic Records singles